The Terzi T30 Katana is an Italian single-seat competition aerobatic monoplane designed by the Milanese aeronautical engineer Pietro Terzi. Terzi built a limited series with his firm Terzi Aerodyne based in Milan, Italy.

Design and development
The Katana is a single-seat monoplane with a fixed conventional landing gear. The wings and tail are aluminum alloy construction with a steel tube fuselage covered with composite shells. It is powered by either a nose-mounted Lycoming IO-720 or Lycoming IO-540 piston engine.

Variant
T30C
Powered by  a 300hp (224kW) Lycoming IO-540 piston engine.
T30E
Powered by  a 400hp (298kW) Lycoming IO-720 piston engine.

Specifications (T30E)

References

Notes

Bibliography

External links
 Pietro Terzi Aircraft

1990s Italian sport aircraft
Aerobatic aircraft
Aircraft first flown in 1991